An emergency law was first enacted in Egypt in 1958, as Law No. 162 of 1958. A state of emergency was declared in 1967 during the 1967 Arab–Israeli War which lasted until 1980. After a break of 18 months, a state of emergency was reimposed following the assassination of President Anwar Sadat in 1981, and was repeatedly extended every three years. The continuous state of emergency was one of the grievances of demonstrators giving rise to the 2011 Egyptian revolution.

After Hosni Mubarak resigned, the emergency law expired on 31 May 2012 and with it the state of emergency, two weeks before the second round of voting in Egypt's 2012 presidential election. On 13 June 2012, the military government imposed de facto martial law (extending the arrest powers of security forces). The Justice Ministry issued a decree giving military officers authority to arrest civilians and try them in military courts. The provision remained in effect until a new constitution was introduced, and meant that those detained could remain in jail for that long according to state-run Egy News.

On 14 August 2013, the acting president of Egypt, Adly Mansour, declared a state of emergency for one month following violent clashes during Rabaa and Nahda sit-in dispersals, which was further extended by another two months. The state of emergency then ended in November 2013, with the exception of North Sinai Governorate, where the Egyptian Armed Forces continues to battle an ongoing jihadist insurgency. Following the 2017 Palm Sunday church bombings, the state of emergency was reinstated nationally, and was continuously extended every three months until President Sisi announced its lifting in October 2021.

Details of the law
During a state of emergency, police powers are extended, constitutional rights are suspended, censorship is legalised and habeas corpus is abolished. It limits non-governmental political activity, including street demonstrations, unapproved political organizations and unregistered financial donations. It permits indefinite detention without trial and hearings of civilians by military courts, prohibits gatherings of more than five people, and limits speech and association.

The Mubarak government had cited the threat of terrorism in extending emergency law, claiming that opposition groups such as the Muslim Brotherhood could gain power in Egypt if the government did not forgo parliamentary elections and suppress the group through emergency law. This has led to the imprisonment of activists without trial, illegal, undocumented and hidden detention facilities and the rejection of university, mosque and newspaper staff based on their political affiliation. A December 2010 parliamentary election was preceded by a media crackdown, arrests, candidate bans (particularly Muslim Brotherhood candidates) and allegations of fraud due to the near-unanimous victory by the NDP in parliament. Human-rights organizations estimate that in 2010, between 5,000 and 10,000 people were in long-term detention without charge or trial. Some 17,000 people were detained under the law, and estimates of political prisoners were as high as 30,000.

Under a state of emergency, the government is empowered to imprison individuals for any period of time, and for virtually no reason. The government justified this by claiming that opposition groups like the Muslim Brotherhood could come into power in Egypt if the then-current government did not forgo parliamentary elections, confiscate the groups' main financiers' possessions, and detain group figureheads, actions which would be virtually impossible without imposing emergency law and preventing the judicial system's independence. Pro-democracy advocates in Egypt argued that this went against the principles of democracy, which include a citizen's right to a fair trial and their right to vote for whichever candidate and/or party they deem fit to run their country.

Extensions
The Emergency Law had been continuously extended every three years since 1981. The legislation was extended in 2003 and was due to expire on 31 May 2006. In 2006, the Emergency Law was extended by two years though President Hosni Mubarak had previously promised reforms including the repeal of the Emergency Law, to replace it with other measures, such as specific anti-terrorism legislation. The extension was justified by the Dahab bombings in April of that year. In May 2008 there was a further extension to June 2010. In May 2010, the law was extended again for two years, albeit with a promise from the government that it will be applied only to 'terrorism and drug' suspects.

During the Egyptian Revolution of 2011, a key demand by the protesters was an end to the state of emergency. While then President  Mubarak indicated he would repeal the emergency law, this was considered unsatisfactory and protests continued. After Mubarak resigned on 11 February 2011, power passed to the Supreme Council of the Armed Forces (SCAF) which stated that the Emergency Law would be repealed when the streets finally clear of protesters. Instead, in September 2011, the SCAF amended a number of articles and added new ones to the Emergency Law, following the 2011 Cairo Israeli embassy attack.

On 24 January 2012, Mohamed Hussein Tantawi gave a televised speech in which he announced that the state of emergency would be partially lifted the following day.

The Emergency Law expired on 31 May 2012 and with it the state of emergency. On 14 August 2013, the acting president of Egypt, Adly Mansour, after the Council of Ministers' approval, declared a state of emergency for one month and ordered the armed forces to help the Interior Ministry enforce security. The decision followed acts of sabotage that resulted in dozens of deaths and hundreds of injuries. It also followed deadly countrywide clashes between supporters of deposed President Mohamed Morsi and the security forces. The state of emergency then ended in November 2013, with the exception of North Sinai Governorate, where the Egyptian Armed Forces continues to battle an ongoing jihadist insurgency. Starting in April 2017, the state of emergency was reinstated across the entire country, and has been continuously renewed every three months, with the most recent renewal being in July 2021.

The state of emergency in Egypt
Recent political and legal developments within the Arab region have resurrected previously dormant historical debates and endowed them with a new life and vitality. The theory of exceptionality has been prominent within these debates, being repeatedly reasserted in different constitutional drafts, and even celebrated, as a means through which political authority maintain and secure ‘the public order’. Over the course of the 20th century, the debates about the state of emergency being a ‘profoundly elusive and ambivalent concept’ have been analyzed in as an act of political governance. Egypt long lasting rule relying on an emergency context has provided a worthy manifestation of how emergency rule have been installed in political and legal settings; and become presented as an only way to govern; in which it had been incorporated in different constitutions and manifested into a political exercise.

References

Law of Egypt
Emergency laws
1958 in law